Jeffrey DaRosa (born July 31, 1982) is an American musician who is a multi-instrumentalist and a member of the Boston-based Dropkick Murphys.

Early life and career 
Growing up in Watertown, Massachusetts (a suburb of Boston) and Somerville, Massachusetts (a suburb of Boston), DaRosa later moved to New York City, where he joined The Exit.

On November 26, 2007, an announcement was made that DaRosa would be joining Boston's Dropkick Murphys after Marc Orrell left the band.

Personal life 
He married Michelle Nolan of Straylight Run on October 8, 2006, and also tours with them as a backup musician.

References

External links 

 

Living people
1982 births
American people of Italian descent
American multi-instrumentalists
American rock bass guitarists
American male bass guitarists
Musicians from Boston
Dropkick Murphys members
Guitarists from Massachusetts
American male guitarists
21st-century American bass guitarists